Madiagne Ndiaye (born 12 November 1952) is a former Senegalese basketball player with AS Forces Armées. Ndiaye competed for Senegal at the 1980 Summer Olympics, where he scored 25 points in 6 games.

References

1952 births
Living people
Senegalese men's basketball players
1978 FIBA World Championship players
Olympic basketball players of Senegal
Basketball players at the 1980 Summer Olympics